Syngnathus is a genus of fish in the family Syngnathidae found in marine, brackish and sometimes fresh waters of the Atlantic, Indian and Pacific Ocean. Fossils of these species are found from the Oligocene to the Pleistocene. They are known from various localities of Greece, Italy, Germany and United States.

Species
There are currently 36 recognized species in this genus:
 Syngnathus abaster A. Risso, 1827 (Black-striped pipefish)
 Syngnathus acus Linnaeus, 1758 (Greater pipefish)
 Syngnathus affinis Eichwald, 1831
 Syngnathus auliscus (Swain, 1882) (Barred pipefish)
 Syngnathus californiensis D. H. Storer, 1845 (Kelp pipefish)
 Syngnathus caribbaeus C. E. Dawson, 1979 (Caribbean pipefish)
 Syngnathus carinatus (C. H. Gilbert, 1892)
 Syngnathus caspius Eichwald, 1831
 Syngnathus chihiroe Matsunuma, 2017 
 Syngnathus dawsoni (Herald, 1969)
 Syngnathus euchrous Fritzsche, 1980 (Chocolate pipefish)
 Syngnathus exilis (R. C. Osburn & Nichols, 1916) (Bar-cheek pipefish)
 Syngnathus floridae (D. S. Jordan & C. H. Gilbert, 1882) (Dusky pipefish)
 Syngnathus folletti Herald, 1942
 Syngnathus fuscus D. H. Storer, 1839 (Northern pipefish)
 Syngnathus insulae Fritzsche, 1980
 Syngnathus leptorhynchus Girard, 1854 (Bay pipefish)
 Syngnathus louisianae Günther, 1870 (Chain pipefish)
 Syngnathus macrobrachium Fritzsche, 1980
 Syngnathus macrophthalmus Duncker, 1915
 Syngnathus makaxi Herald & C. E. Dawson, 1972 (Yucatán pipefish)
 Syngnathus pelagicus Linnaeus, 1758 (Sargassum pipefish)
 Syngnathus phlegon A. Risso, 1827
 Syngnathus rostellatus Nilsson, 1855 (Nilsson's pipefish)
 Syngnathus safina Paulus, 1992
 Syngnathus schlegeli Kaup, 1856 (Seaweed pipefish)
 Syngnathus schmidti A. M. Popov, 1928
 Syngnathus scovelli (Evermann & Kendall, 1896) (Gulf pipefish)
 Syngnathus springeri Herald, 1942 (Bull pipefish)
 Syngnathus taenionotus Canestrini, 1871
 Syngnathus temminckii Kaup, 1856 (Long-snout pipefish) 
 Syngnathus tenuirostris Rathke, 1836 (Narrow-snouted pipefish)
 Syngnathus typhle Linnaeus, 1758 (Broad-nosed pipefish)
 Syngnathus variegatus Pallas, 1814 
 Syngnathus watermeyeri J. L. B. Smith, 1963 (Estuarine pipefish)

References

 
Freshwater fish genera
Marine fish genera
Taxa named by Carl Linnaeus
Extant Oligocene first appearances